is a subway station on the Tokyo Metro Namboku Line in Kita, Tokyo, Japan, operated by Tokyo Metro.

Lines
Shimo Station is served by the Tokyo Metro Namboku Line and is numbered N-18.

Station layout
The station consists of a single underground island platform on the second basement level, serving two tracks.

Platforms

History
Shimo Station opened on 29 November 1991.

The station facilities were inherited by Tokyo Metro after the privatization of the Teito Rapid Transit Authority (TRTA) in 2004.

Surrounding area
 National Route 122
 Nadeshiko Elementary School

Passenger statistics

In fiscal 2019, the station was the third-least used on the Tokyo Metro network with an average of 13,794 passengers daily.

The passenger statistics for previous years are as shown below.

References

External links

 Shimo Station information (Tokyo Metro) 

Kita, Tokyo
Railway stations in Tokyo
Railway stations in Japan opened in 1991
Tokyo Metro Namboku Line